Classique (originally JPGaultier Eau de Parfum) is a women's fragrance created by Jacques Cavallier for Jean Paul Gaultier in 1993. It has been manufactured by Puig since 2016, and was previously manufactured by Shiseido subsidiary Beauté Prestige International from 1995 until 2015. The men's fragrance Le Male was developed as a counterpart to Classique, and was introduced in 1995.

A number of flanker fragrances have since been released on the strength of the Classique name. The most recent fragrance, La Belle Le Parfum, was launched in 2021.

Conception and scent
Classique is described as an oriental floral women's fragrance, a classification which is identified by the combination of a "sweet, warm, powdery base" and flowery or spicy notes. The eau de parfum Classique contains top notes of rose and rum; middle notes of narcissus and vanilla orchid; and base notes of vanilla, amber, tonka bean, and sandalwood.

The bottle design, a female torso wearing a pink corset, has been compared to the corset Gaultier designed for Madonna for her 1990 Blond Ambition World Tour. The fragrance is packaged in an aluminum can, a motif he has used in his collections since 1980; Gaultier felt that "it was in some way a kind of a provocation to put it in something very industrial," and noted that some perfume shops did not offer the fragrance because it was "scandalous". Media personality Kim Kardashian was accused of copying the Classique bottle design for her KKW Body fragrance in April 2018. She claimed that "[Classique is] iconic and celebrates the woman’s body, but [that her] inspiration was a statue [and] wanted [hers] to be really personal with [her] exact mold." Gaultier responded that "[he] couldn’t put [his] body [for a women's perfume], so [he] put a different body. She did her own body, so it's different."

Release and impact
The fragrance was released as JPGaultier Eau de Parfum in 1993, and renamed as Classique in 1995.

Shiseido subsidiary Beauté Prestige International distributed Jean Paul Gaultier fragrances, including Classique from launch in 1993, through a license agreement that was to extend from 1991 through June 30, 2016. On January 1, 2016, Puig acquired the fragrance license from Shiseido for $79.2 million and compensated the early termination of the license for $22.6 million. With this purchase, Puig now holds control of both the fashion and fragrance divisions of the Jean Paul Gaultier brand. A new advertising campaign was premiered in Paris during a relaunch party held by Puig on January 28, 2016, in which a joint commercial for Classique and Le Male retains the "Casta diva" aria from the original commercial and Dutch model Daphne Groeneveld portrays the lead female figure.

The brand's fragrance general manager Thomas James acknowledged Classique and Le Male as "the flagship of the brand [that] represent all the Jean Paul Gaultier values [and will] continue to be an emblematic and historical pillar" at the launch of the women's fragrance Scandal in 2017.

Products
 Eau de toilette spray – 3.3 fl oz (100 ml)

Flanker fragrances
 Indicates repackaging of the original fragrance

References

History of cosmetics
Perfumes
Products introduced in 1993